Vierikko is a surname. Notable people with the surname include:

Helena Vierikko (born 1980), Finnish actress, daughter of Vesa
Vesa Vierikko (born 1956), Finnish actor